Vlachopoulos, feminine: Vlachopoulou is a Greek surname. Notable people include:

 Alexakis Vlachopoulos (1780-1865), Greek military leader, brother of Konstantinos
 Angelos Vlachopoulos (born 1991), Greek water polo player
 Aristotelis Vlachopoulos (1866-1960), Greek Army general
 Konstantinos Vlachopoulos (1789-1868), Greek military leader, brother of Alexakis
 Nikolaos Vlachopoulos (1868-1957), Greek Army general
 Rena Vlachopoulou (1917–2004), Greek actress

Greek-language surnames
Surnames